Daniel Arnold (born March 6, 1980) is a New York City street and fashion photographer. His work appears regularly in Vogue and The New York Times.

Work 
Arnold's work was initially distributed on the photo sharing service Instagram, where he had 1,500 followers as of 2012. He gained visibility when a 2012 Gawker article about him went viral. The article's headline called him "the best photographer on Instagram", and described how he was banned from the photo sharing service. Returning to Instagram under a new account, Arnold attracted over 60,000 followers by 2014.

His work received acclaim from MTV and the fashion magazine Vogue. In March 2014, he sold over US$15,000 in print photographs on the first day he made them available. The New York Times profiled his street photography, calling Arnold "the William Eggleston of Instagram". A profile article in Wired named him "Instagram'''s ultimate street photographer", while The New Yorker turned over their Instagram feed to Arnold for a week to document activity on New York City subways.

In 2017 his work was featured in the documentary Daniel Arnold's New York, and in Vogue that examined life in Middle America. Next year, he covered the 2018 Women's March for Vogue.

After Locals, a collection of photographs of New York commuters published by Dashwood Books in 2013, Arnold published his second photo book Pickpocket in 2021, with an after word by Josh Safdie and produced by Elara Pictures''.

References

External links 
 
 Daniel-Arnold.org – Daniel Arnold's personal website
 When To Say Nothing – Daniel Arnold's current street photography portfolio
 Born To Be Nervous – Daniel Arnold's former blog

Street photographers
Living people
21st-century American photographers
People from Milwaukee
1980 births